Pīra'e  is a commune in the suburbs of Pape'ete in French Polynesia, an overseas territory of France in the Pacific Ocean. Pīra'e is located on the island of Tahiti, in the administrative subdivision of the Windward Islands, themselves part of the Society Islands. It borders Pape'ete in the west and Arue in the east. At the 2017 census it had a population of 14,209. The Stade Pater Te Hono Nui is a stadium located in the commune.

See also

Stade Pater Te Hono Nui

References

Communes of French Polynesia